The vice governor of Jakarta is an elected politician who, along with the governor and 106 members of Regional People's Representative Council (DPRD), is accountable for the strategic government of Jakarta. Jakarta is administratively equal to a province with special status as the capital of Indonesia. Hence, the executive head of Jakarta is a governor, instead of a mayor.

List of vice governors

1960–1964 
The first vice governor, Henk Ngantung, was inaugurated along with his Governor, Soemarno Sosroatmodjo. Soemarno was later dismissed following his appointment as the Minister of Internal Affairs, and was replaced by Henk. Henk inaugurated two vice governors to replace his position.

1964–2002 
After the dismissal of the two vice governors, the government reorganized the job description of the vice governors. The position for the vice governors were added into four and were assigned to handle different affairs. From 1966 to 1984, and from 1997 to 2002, the vice governors were assigned to handle these affairs:

 government and security
 welfare
 economy
 development

In 1984, the four vice governors who handed these affairs were dismissed, and were replaced by three vice governors instead. The economy and development affairs were merged into a single vice governor. This merger was reversed in 1997.

Vice Governor for Government and Security Affairs

Vice Governor for Welfare Affairs

Vice Governor for Economic and Development Affairs

Since 2002
Under Governor Sutiyoso, the tradition of having multiple vice governors was abolished, and on 7 October 2002, he and his vice governor, Fauzi Bowo, was inaugurated together.

References 

Governors, Vice